Bernard Hoffer (born October 14, 1934) is a Swiss-born American composer and conductor. He is best known for his work on American cartoons such as ThunderCats and SilverHawks. He worked on several of Rankin/Bass' television series and specials. The music he developed for The MacNeil-Lehrer Report, used on the PBS NewsHour until 2015, was nominated for an Emmy Award, and he has won six Clio Awards for his work on commercials. He has also conducted several musical shows, such as the ballets A Boston Cinderella! and Ma Goose.

Early life and education 
Hoffer was born in Zurich, Switzerland. In his early years he received musical training at the Dalcroze School in New York, then later studied composition at the Eastman School of Music in Rochester.

Career 
Hoffer worked as the arranger for the U.S. Army Field Band of Washington, D.C., and later became a freelance musician.

Filmography 
 The MacNeil-Lehrer Report (1975)
 The Ivory Ape (1980)
 The Return of the King (1980)
 Circle of Two (1981)
 The Sins of Dorian Gray (1983)
 The Coneheads (TV special) (1983)
 ThunderCats (1985)
 The Life & Adventures of Santa Claus (1985)
 SilverHawks (1986)
 The Wind in the Willows (1987)
 The Comic Strip (1987)
 The NewsHour with Jim Lehrer (2006)

External links 
 

1934 births
Living people
Swiss conductors (music)
Male conductors (music)
21st-century American composers
American male classical composers
American classical composers
Swiss emigrants to the United States
Musicians from Zürich
Eastman School of Music alumni
21st-century conductors (music)
21st-century American male musicians
21st-century Swiss composers